London Buses route 78 is a Transport for London contracted bus route in London, England. Running between Shoreditch and Nunhead, it is operated by Arriva London.

History

In December 1952, a number 78 double-decker bus was crossing Tower Bridge. At that time, the gateman would ring a warning bell and close the gates when the bridge was clear before the watchman ordered the raising of the bridge. The process failed while a relief watchman was on duty. The bus was near the edge of the south bascule when it started to rise; driver Albert Gunter made a split-second decision to accelerate the bus, clearing a  drop onto the north bascule, which had not started to rise. The conductor broke his leg, and twelve of the twenty passengers aboard received minor injuries. The driver was later rewarded with a £10 bonus (£306.58/US$416 in 2022 money) for his bravery.

On 20 May 2000 it was extended from Peckham Rye to Nunhead. The route was retained by Arriva London following re-tendering in 2003, November 2010 and November 2015.

New Alexander Dennis Enviro400 double deckers were introduced on 17 April 2011, replacing the existing single deckers.

Following the November 2015 tender, new Alexander Dennis Enviro400H City vehicles were ordered with the expectation that they would enter service in November 2015. The first buses of this type to operate in London, the Alexander Dennis Enviro400H City is visually styled on the New Routemaster and Alexander Dennis Enviro200 MMC, suggested to be a cost-effective alternative to the New Routemaster for use in the London suburbs. The first of these entered service on 7 December 2015.

Current route
Route 78 operates via these primary locations:
Shoreditch Calvert Avenue
Shoreditch High Street station 
Bishopsgate
Liverpool Street station    
Aldgate station 
Tower Gateway station 
Tower of London
Tower Bridge
City Hall
Bermondsey
Peckham High Street
Peckham Rye station  
Nunhead St Mary's Road

References

External links

Bus routes in London
Transport in the London Borough of Southwark
Transport in the London Borough of Tower Hamlets
Transport in the City of London
Transport in the London Borough of Hackney